The 2009–10 Indiana Hoosiers women's basketball team represents Indiana University in the 2009–10 NCAA Division I basketball season. The Hoosiers were coached by Felisha Legette-Jack. The Hoosiers are a member of the Big Ten Conference.

Offseason
Aug 13: Indiana head coach has announced the addition of Scott Dorrell as Video Coordinator. Dorrell joins the staff after spending 2 seasons as a manager.

Aug 1: Indiana head coach has announced the addition of Evan Suttner as Graduate Assistant  Suttner joins the staff after spending 3 seasons as head manager.

May 1: Indiana head coach has announced the addition of Amaka Agugua to the Hoosier women's basketball coaching staff. She will begin her duties at Indiana on Monday, May 4. Agugua comes to IU after spending three seasons at Virginia Commonwealth.
May 5: The Hoosiers will host Florida State on Thursday, Dec. 3, in the third annual Big Ten/ACC Women's Basketball Challenge in Assembly Hall in Bloomington. The Hoosiers are 1–1 in the history of the challenge. The challenge began during the 2007–08 season. In the inaugural challenge, Indiana hosted Florida State and lost, 85–78. Last season, the Hoosiers traveled to Coral Gables, Fla., and defeated Miami, 69–54.
May 18:  Amber Jackson scored 22 points and Whitney Thomas collected a double-double with 15 points and 14 rebounds as the Indiana women's basketball team defeated USD Santa Marinella, an Italian B professional league team, 87–39.
May 20: Nine Hoosiers got in the scoring column as the Indiana women's basketball team defeated Firenze Basket in Florence, Italy, 88–41, in its second game on a 10-day tour of Italy. Firenze Basket is a member of the Italian A-2 professional league.
May 21:The Hoosiers came back from a 12-point deficit early in the third quarter to defeat Sernavimar Marghera, 79–69, in its third game on a tour of Italy. The Hoosiers will play their final game in Italy on Sunday, May 24, when they face ASD Geas Basket in Lake Como.

Exhibition

Regular season
The Hoosiers will participate in the Junkanoo Jam on November 26 and 27.

Roster

Schedule

Player stats

Postseason

Big Ten tournament

NCAA Basketball tournament

Awards and honors

Team players drafted into the WNBA

See also
2009–10 Big Ten women's basketball season
2009–10 Indiana Hoosiers men's basketball team

References

External links
Official Site

Indiana Hoosiers women's basketball seasons
Indiana Hoosiers
Indiana Hoosiers
Indiana Hoosiers